Madiyar Sandybaiuly Ibraibekov (born September 4, 1995) a Kazakh professional ice hockey defenceman who played for Barys Astana of the Kontinental Hockey League (KHL).

Career statistics

Regular season and playoffs

International

References

External links
 

1995 births
Living people
Asian Games gold medalists for Kazakhstan
Asian Games medalists in ice hockey
Barys Astana draft picks
Barys Nur-Sultan players
Competitors at the 2017 Winter Universiade
Ice hockey people from Moscow
Ice hockey players at the 2017 Asian Winter Games
Kazakhstani ice hockey defencemen
Medalists at the 2017 Asian Winter Games
Nomad Astana players
Snezhnye Barsy players
Universiade medalists in ice hockey
Universiade silver medalists for Kazakhstan